Karuniya  is a village development committee in Rautahat District in the Narayani Zone of south-eastern Nepal. At the time of the 1991 Nepal census it had a population of 4437 people living in 834 individual households. It's among few Muslim majority villages of Nepal.

References

Populated places in Rautahat District